The Rooster Comb is a  multi-peak mountain located in the Alaska Range, in Denali National Park and Preserve, in the U.S. state of Alaska. The mountain's descriptive name was submitted by Bradford Washburn in 1957 based on an original description by Claude Ewing Rusk during his 1910 Mazama Expedition: "To our west was a remarkable mountain, rising abruptly from the snowfields to a height of at least 10,000 feet, its tip a succession of corniced spires, like a great rooster comb."

Climate

Based on the Köppen climate classification, this mountain is located in a subarctic climate zone with long, cold, snowy winters, and mild summers. Temperatures can drop below −20 °C with wind chill factors below −30 °C. The months May through June offer the most favorable weather for climbing or viewing.

See also

Mountain peaks of Alaska
Geography of Alaska

References

External links
 Weather forecast: The Rooster Comb
 Localized weather: Mountain Forecast

Gallery

Alaska Range
Mountains of Matanuska-Susitna Borough, Alaska
Mountains of Denali National Park and Preserve
Mountains of Alaska
North American 3000 m summits